Jaak Tamleht (10 February 1942 – 13 July 1986) was an Estonian actor.

Education
He graduated from the drama school at the Estonian Academy of Music and Theatre in 1972.

Career
Tamleht served as a presenter for Eesti Televisioon. From 1972 to 1976 he worked at the Tallinn City Theatre. From 1982 to 1986 he worked at Vanalinnastuudio.

Tamleht worked on construction sites as a truck and taxi driver when he was not working in entertainment.

Personal life
Tamleht married five times. He died in the village Vihula.

Selected filmography
Pimedad aknad - 1968
Don Juan Tallinnas - 1971

References

External links 

1942 births
1986 deaths
20th-century Estonian male actors
Estonian male film actors
Estonian male stage actors
Estonian male television actors
Estonian television personalities
Estonian Academy of Music and Theatre alumni
Burials at Metsakalmistu
Male actors from Tallinn